Episteme adulatrix, the day flying moth, is a species of moth in the genus Episteme of the family Noctuidae.

Distribution
This species can be found in India, western China, Nepal, Burma and Taiwan.

Description
The upperside of the forewings is black, with large yellow markings, a row of small white spots and pale blue spots at the base. The upperside of the hindwings is black, with small white submarginal spots and orange spots near the anal angle. Head, thorax and abdomen are black, abdomen with blood-red bands.

Biology
It is a day flying moth (hence the common name). Caterpillars feed on Solanum tuberosum.

Gallery

References

External links
 Inaturalist

Agaristinae
Moths described in 1844